Ezilí Dantor or Erzulie Dantó is the main loa (or lwa) or senior spirit of the Petro family in Haitian Vodou. Ezili Danto, or Ezili Danto', is the "manifestation of Erzulie, the divinity of love,". It is said that Ezili Danto has a dark complexion and is maternal in nature. The Ezili are feminine spirits in Haitian vodou culture that personify womanhood. The Erzulie is a goddess, spirit, or loa of love in Haitian voudou. She has several manifestations or incarnations, but most prominent and well-known manifestations are Lasirenn (the mermaid), Erzulie Freda, and Erzulie Dantor. There are spelling variations of Erzulie, the other being Ezili. They are English interpretations of a Creole word, but do not differ in meaning.

Worship 
Tuesdays are the days reserved to worship Ezili Dantor. Worship is normally done in solitary in front of an altar identified by the colours blue, green and red. The most recurrent sacrifices consist of créme de cacáo, jewels, golden rings and Agua de Florida. For her birthday a wild pig is normally the main sacrifice.

Haitian Mythology 
In Haitian mythology, there are multiple spiritual entities, or lwa, that work between this world (the mortal world) and the divine world. The Ezili is the Rada spirit that personifies different aspects of womanhood. Ezili Freya represents romantic love and erotic sexuality, while Ezili Danto represents the hardworking and sometimes angry mother.  In Haitian society, Ezili Danto strongly resonates with lower class women.

While she represents hardworking women and mothers, Ezili Danto also has the power to destroy. Her vehement displeasure has earned her the reputation of being the red eyed, "Erzulie, ge-rouge." Her destructive powers often come in the form of natural disasters and the forces of nature. In Zora Neale Hurston, Haiti, and Their Eyes Were Watching God, Ezili's Danto's rage is described as "violent reminder to the folk that their passive faith in Euro-Americans, or Christianity, to determine their fate is misguided."

Ezili Dantor and the Haitian Revolution

It is accounted that the slave revolt of 1791, started with a pact which followed a big feast in honour to Ezili Dantor. For this reason she is considered the national loa. Considered to be the loa of vengeance and rage, made it to be popular among single mothers during the 1980s and 1990s in Haiti and Dominican Republic.

The syncretic modern representation of this loa is commonly associated to the Black Madonna of Częstochowa, the patron saint of Poland. The original association of Ezili Dantor with this Catholic icon is hypothesized to be from copies of the icon brought to Haiti by Polish soldiers sent by order of Napoleon Bonaparte, to subdue the then still ongoing Haitian Revolution. It is accounted that the Polish legion saw the struggle of the Polish nation during the Partitions of Poland in the struggle of the Haitian slaves in fights for their freedom, and as a result the Polish soldiers eventually turned on the French army to join the Haitian slaves. As a consequence of this action, during Jean-Jacques Dessalines's 1804 massacre, which took place shortly after the Haitian victory; the Poles were left alive and granted citizenship of the newly-founded Republic of Haiti. The descendants of these soldiers are still living in the island, specifically in the locality of Cazale.

A generalized misconception about Ezilí Dantor is to associate the loa with motherhood, mostly in Louisiana's voodoo and other American modern assimilations of voodoo. Mostly because of its association with a portrait of Mother Mary with child Jesus. The accurate modern reading from Haitian accounts by voodoo priests and worshippers from the island, is to associate the pink dressed child Jesus with Ezilí Freda, the younger sibling of Ezilí Dantor, who is also responsible of leaving 2 scars on Dantor's cheek during a fight over the love of Ogun, according to the legend.

Appearance in Books 
The 2013 novel Zora Neale Hurston, Haiti, and Their Eyes Were Watching God is a collection of ten (10) essays from various authors that break down and analyze the literary work of Zora Neale Hurston, and her 1937 novel Their Eyes Were Watching God. Hurston's stories follow a light-skinned woman by the name of Janie Crawford. Hurston writes the character of Janie with characteristics that resemble Ezili Freda, but that both Freda and Danto live within her. Janie falls in love with and marries a dark-skinned man named Tea Cake, but must show him that she is not above working in the fields like other working class folk. By working in the fields, Janie shows that she is not afraid of hard work, is mature, and embraces Ezili Danto.

In the Mambo Reina Series by Veronica G. Henry, the main character is a Mamba who is dedicated to Erzulie.

See also 

 Erzulie

References

Folk saints
Haitian Vodou gods
Black Madonna of Częstochowa
National personifications
Polish diaspora in North America